Somabrachys zion is a moth in the family Somabrachyidae. It was described by Walter Hopp in 1922.

References

Zygaenoidea
Moths described in 1922